Borophagus diversidens ("devouring glutton") is an extinct species of the genus Borophagus of the subfamily Borophaginae, a group of canids endemic to North America from the late Miocene epoch through the Pliocene epoch 4.9—1.8 Ma.

Overview
Borophagus diversidens was named by Cope in 1892. Members of its subfamily, Borophaginae, are loosely known as "bone-crushing" or "hyena-like" dogs.  Though not the most massive borophagine by size or weight, it had a more highly evolved capacity to crunch bone than earlier, larger genera such as Epicyon, which seems to be an evolutionary trend of the group (Turner, 2004). During the Pliocene epoch, Borophagus began being displaced by Canis genera such as Canis edwardii and later by Canis dirus. Early species of Borophagus were placed in the genus Osteoborus until recently, but the genera are now considered synonyms. B. diversidens possibly led a hyena-like lifestyle scavenging carcasses of recently dead animals.

Taxonomy
Typical features of this genus are a bulging forehead and powerful jaws; it was probably a scavenger. Its crushing premolar teeth and strong jaw muscles would have been used to crack open bone, much like the hyena of the Old World.

Recombination
Borophagus diversidens was recombined as Dinocyon (Borophagus) diversidens by Matthew in 1902 and then recombined as Dinocyon diversidens by Matthew the same year. It was recombined as Hyaenarctos diversidens.

Fossil distribution
Borophagus diversidens fossil specimens are very widespread from 2 sites in central Florida to central Mexico, from western Oregon and western Washington to New Mexico, Arizona, and Texas.

References 

Alan Turner, "National Geographic:  Prehistoric Mammals" (Washington, D.C.:  Firecrest Books Ltd., 2004), pp. 112–114.  
Xiaoming Wang, "The Origin and Evolution of the Dog Family"  Accessed 1/30/06.

Further reading

Picture of an Osteoborus skull in a museum, from "World of the Wolf."  (Accessed 6/19/06)
Russell Hunt, "Ecological Polarities Of the North American Family Canidae: A New Approach to Understanding Forty Million Years of Canid Evolution" (Accessed 1/30/06).
Wang et al., "Phylogenetic Systematics of the Borophaginae (Carnivora:Canidae)."  Bulletin of the American Museum of Natural History, No. 243, Nov. 17 1999. (PDF) (Accessed 4/11/06)

Borophagines
Miocene canids
Pliocene carnivorans
Prehistoric mammals of North America